Kristine Pedersen is a Danish football midfielder currently playing in the Elitedivisionen for Fortuna Hjørring, with whom she has also played the Champions League. She is a member of the Danish national team since 2008.

References

1986 births
Living people
Danish women's footballers
Denmark women's international footballers
Women's association football midfielders